The 2016 Rugby Championship was the fifth edition of the annual southern hemisphere Rugby Championship, featuring Argentina, Australia, South Africa and New Zealand. The competition is operated by SANZAAR, a joint venture of the four countries' national unions. New Zealand won their first four matches with bonus points to gain an unassailable lead, winning the title for the fourth time.

The tournament started on 20 August after the 2016 Summer Olympics had concluded, with Australia hosting New Zealand and South Africa hosting Argentina. The tournament ran for eight weeks with two bye weeks, ending on 8 October, when South Africa faced New Zealand and Argentina played Australia at Twickenham Stadium in London.

Background 
The tournament was operated by SANZAAR and known for sponsorship reasons as The Castle Rugby Championship in South Africa, The Investec Rugby Championship in New Zealand, The Castrol Edge Rugby Championship in Australia and The Personal Rugby Championship in Argentina.

The 2016 Championship returned to a 6-round format, with each team playing the other home and away. The previous year it had been reduced to 3 rounds so that the 2015 Rugby World Cup could be accommodated. It was the first tournament for which Argentina was a full member of SANZAAR, and the first in which they had a team competing in the SANZAAR-run Super Rugby competition.

For the first time a match was played in a neutral venue. Argentina's home match against Australia on 8 October was held at Twickenham Stadium in London.

Australia were the holders of the title, having won the 2015 edition.

Overview
In June there was a break from the 2016 Super rugby tournament while the four Southern Hemisphere national teams played test matches against touring Northern Hemisphere nations. New Zealand won all three tests against Wales, Australia were whitewashed by England in their three tests (the first time they had lost a series against England in Australia), Argentina's series against France ended in one win each and Ireland won their first match in South Africa before losing the next two and the series. These results and their 11-match winning streak leading into the tournament made New Zealand firm favourites to secure their fourth Rugby Championship title since it expanded to include Argentina five years ago.

The opening match was played between New Zealand and Australia at Stadium Australia in Sydney. New Zealand comprehensively beat Australia 42–8, scoring six tries to one. In the first half Ryan Crotty, Jerome Kaino, Waisake Naholo and man of the match Beauden Barrett scored tries for New Zealand, while Australia only managed a solitary penalty through Bernard Foley. Australia's cause was not helped as they lost three backs (Matt Giteau, Rob Horne and Matt To'omua) to injury. After the break New Zealand scored two more tries with Dane Coles and Julian Savea dotting down, while Nick Phipps scored a consolation try for Australia at the end. South Africa narrowly beat Argentina 30–23 at Mbombela Stadium, scoring a try in the final minutes to take the lead. South Africa took an early lead after Ruan Combrinck scored a try in the corner, but Argentina struck back though a try of their own to Matías Orlando to take a 13–10 lead into the half-time break. Late in the second half Argentina looked to have won the game when Santiago Cordero collected a Nicolás Sánchez chip to give Argentina a 10-point lead with 11 minutes remaining. However, South Africa leveled after a Johan Goosen try and an Elton Jantjies penalty, before Warren Whiteley sealed the win with two minutes remaining.

The second round featured the same teams playing their return matches. New Zealand kept Australia try-less, winning 29–9 and retaining the Bledisloe Cup for the 13th straight year. Despite Israel Dagg scoring two tries, Australia put in a better defensive effort and New Zealand only led 15–9 at the half time break. Julian Savea and Sam Cane scored a try each in the second half while keeping Australia scoreless. Argentina reversed the result against South Africa in Salta, kicking a last minute penalty to secure a 26–24 victory. Argentina outplayed South Africa in the first half, scoring one try to fullback Joaquin Tuculet, to lead 13–3. South Africa struck back in the second half with veteran winger Bryan Habana scoring a record 65th test try. Juan Leguizamon scored a second try for Argentina and they led by seven with 13 minutes remaining. South Africa took the lead for the first time in the match with six minutes left when Pieter-Steph du Toit scored a try and then Morne Steyn landed a penalty. Argentina were able to defended strongly to prevent South Africa scoring any more points, before Gonzalez Iglesias landed a match winning penalty in the 77th minute.

After a week's break Argentina traveled to New Zealand and following a competitive first half dropped away to lose 57–22. Argentina took the lead after only two minutes as Cordero scored under the posts from the opening passage of play. However, New Zealand struck straight back with a Julian Savea try. Ben Smith and Barrett also scored for New Zealand while Sanchez's four penalties kept Argentina close, with New Zealand leading 24–19 at half time. The second half was all New Zealand as they scored five tries to Ben Smith, Charlie Faumuina, Luke Romano and Crotty twice against a solitary penalty from Sanchez. Australia hosted South Africa, ending a six match losing streak after clinching a 23–17 victory in the wet at Brisbane. Only one point separated the two teams at the half time break. Whiteley and Goosen had scored tries early for South Africa to give them the lead, while an Adam Coleman try and two Foley penalties brought Australia to within one point. Early in the second half South African lock Eben Etzebeth was sin binned for a dangerous challenge and Foley kicked the resulting penalty to give Australia a slight lead. Foley then scored the decisive try 20 minutes later to give them their first win of the tournament.

In the fourth round New Zealand continued their winning form, downing South Africa 41–13 in Christchurch, while Argentina fell to a 36–20 defeat in Australia. New Zealand hooker Coles set up tries for Dagg, Julian Savea and Sam Whitelock with some crisp passing. Ben Smith, Ardie Savea and TJ Perenara also scored tries, while South Africa's only try came early when Habana crossed in the first 10 minutes. Australia jumped to a 21-point lead against Argentina after Samu Kerevi, Dane Haylett-Petty and Will Genia all scored converted tries in the first 12 minutes. Argentina responded with two penalties and at half-time the score was 21–6. Cordera scored early in the second half to bring the deficit to eight, before Sean McMahon beat four defenders to set up Genia's second try. Quade Cooper then set up a decisive try for Michael Hooper to give Australia a 20-point lead, with Argentina only managing a late consolation try to Facundo Isa.

Four wins from four games and four bonus points for scoring at least three tries more than their opposition in each game meant that the Rugby Championship title returned to New Zealand with two rounds still to play.
 The 24 tries scored by New Zealand at this point in the tournament is more than the other three nations combined and they are within three wins of the record for the longest winning streak in tests. Stuart Barnes has labelled the current New Zealand team the most dominant in rugby history, something which former New Zealand captain Sean Fitzpatrick does not think is "good for the game as a whole".

Standings

Fixtures

Round 1

Notes:
 Allan Alaalatoa (Australia) made his international debut.
 Kane Hames (New Zealand) made his international debut.
 This was New Zealand's first win over Australia at Stadium Australia since 2013.		

Notes:
 Agustín Creevy (Argentina) earned his 50th test cap.

Round 2

Notes:
 Anton Lienert-Brown (New Zealand) and Reece Hodge (Australia) made their international debuts.
 Wyatt Crockett (New Zealand) earned his 50th test cap.
 New Zealand retain the Bledisloe Cup.

Notes:
 Felipe Arregui (Argentina) made his international debut.
 Tomás Cubelli (Argentina) earned his 50th test cap.
 Argentina beat South Africa for the first time on home soil.

Round 3

Notes:
 Marcos Kremer (Argentina) made his international debut.

Notes:
 Eben Etzebeth became the youngest South African player to earn his 50th test cap.
 This was Australia's first back-to-back win over South Africa since their 2011/12 wins.
 Australia retain the Mandela Challenge Plate.

Round 4

Notes:
 Malcolm Marx (South Africa) made his international debut.
 Francois Louw (South Africa) earned his 50th test cap.
 New Zealand retained the Freedom Cup.

Notes:
 Dean Mumm (Australia) earned his 50th test cap.
 Tom Robertson and Lopeti Timani (both Australia) made their international debuts.
 Australia retain the Puma Trophy.
 With this Australian win, New Zealand secured their fourth Rugby Championship title, with two rounds to play.

Round 5

Notes:
 Sefa Naivalu (Australia) made his international debut.

Notes:
 Damian McKenzie (New Zealand) made his international debut.

Round 6

Notes:
 This was New Zealand's biggest winning margin over South Africa away, surpassing the previous 36 point-margin set in 2003.
 The 57 points scored were the most conceded by South Africa ever.
 New Zealand equaled a tier 1 record of 17 consecutive wins in a row.

Notes:
 Leroy Houston (Australia) made his international debut.

Squads

Summary

Note: Ages, caps and domestic side are of 20 August 2016 – the starting date of the tournament

Argentina
On 20 July 2016, Argentina named a 33-man squad for the Championship.

1 On 10 August 2016, Felipe Arregui, replacing Santiago García Botta, was named in Argentina's 26-man travelling squad for the opening match against South Africa.

Australia
On 29 July 2016, Michael Cheika named a 36-man training squad for the 2016 Rugby Championship.

On 5 August, Cheika named the final 33-man squad for the Championship, with Nick Frisby, Luke Morahan and Toby Smith missing out on the final squad.

1 On 4 September, Rory Arnold, Kyle Godwin, Luke Morahan, Sefa Naivalu and Henry Speight were called up to the squad as injury replacements and cover for Adam Ashley-Cooper (returned to France), Matt Giteau and Rob Horne (ruled out for remainder of Championship) and Ben McCalman and Matt To'omua (still recovering from injury sustained in Round 1).

2 On 11 September, Toby Smith was called up to the squad as injury cover for Allan Alaalatoa, who was ruled out of Round 4 after sustaining an injury against South Africa in Round 3.

3 On 21 September, Nick Frisby and Tolu Latu was called up to the squad for the final two rounds, with Latu replacing Tatafu Polota-Nau in the squad due to injury.

4 On 3 October, Leroy Houston was called up to the squad as an injury replacement for Sean McMahon ahead of the final round of the Championship.

New Zealand
New Zealand's 32-man squad for the Championship was announced on 1 August 2016.

1 On 11 August, Anton Lienert-Brown was called up to replace Sonny Bill Williams who was injured during the 2016 Summer Olympics rugby sevens tournament.

2 On 14 August, Kane Hames and Matt Todd were added to the squad for the first match of the Championship as injury cover for Joe Moody and Sam Cane.

3 On 22 August, Liam Coltman, Rieko Ioane, Damian McKenzie, James Parsons and Seta Tamanivalu were called up to the squad as injury cover for Ryan Crotty, Nathan Harris, George Moala, Waisake Naholo and Codie Taylor.

South Africa
Head coach Allister Coetzee named the following 31-man training squad for the 2016 Rugby Championship on 6 August 2016:

1 Trevor Nyakane was initially included pending medical clearance. However, his ankle injury ruled him out of the first two matches of the Rugby Championship and he was replaced by Lourens Adriaanse.

2 On 11 September, Willem Alberts was called up to the squad as injury cover for Lood de Jager.

3 On 21 September, Patrick Lambie and Willie le Roux were called up to the squad, with Lambie being called up after recovering from injury and Le Roux a tactical call up.

4 On 3 October, Piet van Zyl was called up to the squad as an injury replacement for Rudy Paige for the final round of the Championship.

Statistics

Points scorers

Try scorers

See also
 History of rugby union matches between Argentina and Australia
 History of rugby union matches between Argentina and New Zealand
 History of rugby union matches between Argentina and South Africa
 History of rugby union matches between Australia and South Africa
 History of rugby union matches between Australia and New Zealand
 History of rugby union matches between New Zealand and South Africa

References

2016 in Argentine rugby union
2016 in Australian rugby union
2016 in New Zealand rugby union
2016 in South African rugby union
2016 rugby union tournaments for national teams
August 2016 sports events
October 2016 sports events
September 2016 sports events
2014